L'Art Nouveau may refer to:

Art Nouveau, an art movement between about 1890 and 1905
Maison de l'Art Nouveau, an art gallery opened by Siegfried Bing